Dreadnoughts was a First World War naval strategy computer game by Turcan Research Systems, and available in Amiga, Atari ST, Acorn Archimedes and MS-DOS formats.

Gameplay 

Players could choose to play as The Royal Navy or Imperial German Navy and can re-fight several real and fantasy naval battles from the war including:-

 Battle of Coronel (With or without HMS Canopus present)
 Battle of the Falkland Islands
 Battle Of Dogger Bank
 Battle Of Jutland

Players may fight against each other, or against the computer and command their forces by typing in commands and sending them to the required ships or squadrons to carry out.

There was also an option to watch a computer v computer battle.

Reception
A 1993 Computer Gaming World survey of wargames gave the game two-plus stars out of five, calling it "interesting, albeit very slow".

See also 
 Naval warfare
 Harpoon (series)

References

External links 

Another article on the game at Home of the Underdogs
Article and option to view user manual

1992 video games
Acorn Archimedes games
Amiga games
Atari ST games
DOS games
Ship simulation games
Naval video games
World War I video games
Naval games
Video games developed in the United States